Azanza is an Asian genus of shrubs in the family Malvaceae and tribe Gossypieae.

Species
Plants of the World Online lists two species (previously placed in Thespesia):
 Azanza lampas (Cav.) Alef. - type species
 Azanza thespesioides (R.Br. ex Benth.) F.Areces (Australia)

References

External links

Gossypieae
Malvaceae genera